Jebel Sasan is a large hill in the Tel Afar District of Nineveh Province of northern Iraq.
The name may also be rendered as Jabal Sasan.

Geology

Jebel Sasan is in a transitional folded zone between an alpinotype area to the northeast and the Arabian Shield to the southwest.
Tectonic movements in the Late Cretaceous caused formation of a rapidly subsiding trough aligned east-west passing below Jabal Sinjar and Jabal Sasan into the Butmah area. Open-sea globigerina sedimentation filled the trough at about the same rate as subsidence throughout the Late Cretaceous.

Geography

The region includes the anticlines of Jebel Sinjar, Jebel Sinu, Jebel Sasan, Jebel Zambar, Jebel Sheik Ibrahim and Jebel Adaiya.
The Jebels Zambar and Ibrahim are sometimes treated as one structure.
The Sanjar-Zambar mountain range includes the Teymurlenk (Tamerlane) hills, which contain the Turkmen city of Tal Afar.
A shallow saddle to the southeast divides it from the similar Jebel Zambar structure.

Agriculture

The first farming villages in the Mespotamian lowlands are those of the Hassuna pottery makers, dating to around 6000 BC.
These villages are most concentrated in the northern Jazira plains to the north and south of Jebels Sinjar and Ishkaft, to the west and north of Jebel Sasan.

Jebel Sasan is part of an arc of hills that includes Jebel Abd el-Aziz and Jebel Sinjar to the west, and Jebel Ishkaft, Jebel Ibrahim and Jebel Maqlub to the east. 
As moist air travels up the valleys of the Tigris and Euphrates it deposits moisture on the southern slopes of these hills, creating a more fertile zone to the south of the dry farming area.
To the south of Tel Afar in the gap between Jebel Sasan and Jebel Ibrahim there is lower rainfall than to the north, but more groundwater, with many springs along the southern edge of the hills behind Tel Afar.
In ancient times this zone contained significant kingdoms. Of these Karana may lie below Tel Afar.

References

Sources

Mountains of Iraq
Nineveh Governorate